Knights of Valour is a side-scrolling beat 'em up video game series released by International Games System (IGS). The plot is loosely adapted from the 14th century Chinese historical novel Romance of the Three Kingdoms by Luo Guanzhong, and features the Five Tiger Generals, Zhuge Liang, Diaochan and others as playable characters. The gameplay involves the use of magical powers that are not featured in other games also based on the novel.

The series includes eleven games, including five main titles: Knights of Valour (1999), Knights of Valour 2 (2000), Knights of Valour: The Seven Spirits (2003), Knights of Valour 3 (2011), and the remade Knights of Valour (2015). The original games were developed for arcades and released in Traditional Chinese, Simplified Chinese, Japanese, Korean and English. All but two games in the series ran on the IGS' own PolyGame Master arcade hardware, the exceptions being KOV The Seven Spirits, which was released on Sammy Corporation's Atomiswave (later received a homebrew port for the Dreamcast in 2020), and the Knights of Valour 3D iteration, which was released online for PlayStation 4 and mobile.

On 17 September 2014 at the Tokyo Game Show, IGS announced the release of a 3D installment of Knights of Valour for the PlayStation 4. A preview trailer was showcased and featured Japanese in-game character voices. The free-to-play game was slated for release in Spring 2015 in Asia and Japan. In January 2015 at the Taipei Game Show, it was announced the game had been delayed to a summer release. The game will be monetized by selling the ability to continue after being defeated and will support up to for online players.

On 4 March 2015, a beta version was released for trial for PlayStation Plus subscribers on the PS4 and ran until 19 March.

On 3 February 2017, it was announced by GamesInFlame that they would be publishing the game in Europe and Australia starting that month.

Characters

Games released

References

External links 
 PlayStation 4 page: Singapore retail, Singapore demo
 IGS page: Taiwan 

1999 video games
Arcade video games
Arcade-only video games
Beat 'em ups
Cooperative video games
International Games System games
PolyGame Master games
Video games based on Romance of the Three Kingdoms
Video games developed in Taiwan